Starvation Blues is a 1925 silent short subject comedy film. It stars Syd Crossley and Clyde Cook as street musicians struggling to eke out a living in the cold. Stan Laurel, one of the writers for the picture, would go on to exploit a similar premise in his 1930 film Below Zero with Oliver Hardy.

Cast
 Clyde Cook as 1st Street Musician
 Syd Crossley as 2nd Street Musician
 Mildred June as Cafe Owner's Daughter
 Cesare Gravina as Cafe Owner
 Frederick Kovert as Dancer (as Frederick Kovert)
 Fred Kelsey as Prohibition Officer
 Tiny Sandford as Policeman

References

External links 

 
 

1925 films
Hal Roach Studios short films
American silent short films
American black-and-white films
1925 comedy films
Films directed by Richard Wallace
American comedy short films
1920s English-language films
1920s American films